There's No Need to Struggle is an album by jazz pianist Horace Silver, his third released on the Silverto label, featuring performances by Silver with Eddie Harris, Bobby Shew, Ralph Moore, Bob Maize, and Carl Burnett with vocals by Weaver Copeland and Mahmu Pearl. The Allmusic review awarded the album 3 stars.

Track listing
All compositions and lyrics by Horace Silver
 "I Don't Know What I'm Gonna Do"
 "Don't Dwell On Your Problems"
 "Everything Gonna Be Alright"
 "There's No Need to Struggle"
 "Seeking the Plan"
 "Discovering the Plan"
 "Fulfilling the Plan"
 "Happiness and Contentment"
Recorded in New York City on August 25 & September 1, 1983.

Personnel
Horace Silver - piano
Eddie Harris - tenor saxophone
Bobby Shew - trumpet
Ralph Moore - tenor saxophone
Bob Maize - bass
Carl Burnette - drums
Weaver Copeland, Mahmu Pearl - vocals

References

Horace Silver albums
Silverto Records albums
1983 albums